The Immaculate Conception Cathedral of Pasig, locally known as The Pasig Cathedral is the Catholic church located in Plaza Rizal, Barangay Malinao, Pasig in Metro Manila, Philippines. It is the mother church, and the episcopal seat of the Diocese of Pasig and one of the oldest structures in the city.

It was founded as a parish by the Augustinian missionaries on July 2, 1573, coinciding with the foundation of the town of Pasig. Initially, the parish was consecrated to the Visitation of Our Lady, but on April 25, 1587, was changed to Our Lady of the Immaculate Conception, the patroness of the Augustinian priests during that time.

The parish was administered by the CICM Fathers from 1910 to 1979, after which the Filipino clergy took over the pastoral leadership of the parish. Until 2003, the parish was a part of the Archdiocese of Manila. During the time of Manila Archbishop Jaime Cardinal Sin, the parish belonged to the Ecclesiastical District of Makati until October 2001, when it became part of the newly created Ecclesiastical District of Pasig. On August 21, 2003, the district was elevated as a separate and independent diocese, with the elevation of the parish into the status of a cathedral. The present parish priest and rector of the cathedral is Rev. Fr. Mariano L. Baranda.

History 

The Immaculate Conception Parish was initially established as a mission-parish by an Augustinian friar, Alonso de Alvarado, on January 20, 1572, in the village of Pinagbuhatan. However, frequent flooding in the original site prompted the Augustinian priests to relocate it to higher ground, where the cathedral now currently stands.

On July 2, 1573, coinciding with the establishment of the town (now city) of Pasig, the church was consecrated to the Our Lady of the Visitation, which served as the first patroness of Pasig. The town patroness was eventually changed into the Our Lady of the Immaculate Conception on April 25, 1587.

During the brief British occupation of Manila in 1762 to 1764, the church served as the British military headquarters, its belfry used as a watchtower against the Spanish defenders.

After the Augustinians, the CICM missionaries arrived and began the administration of the parish in 1910. Three years later, the congregation founded the first parochial school for boys (present-day Pasig Catholic College). In 1979, the diocesan clergy from the Archdiocese of Manila took over the supervision of the parish, and Manuel Sobreviñas, then auxiliary bishop of Manila, became the first Filipino parish priest. Assisting him as parochial administrator was Andres Desmet.

In 1993, Sobreviñas became the bishop of the Diocese of Imus. Emmanuel Sunga became the new pastor, and was transferred to Santo Niño Parish in Tondo, Manila four years later. Manuel Gabriel came to Pasig in 1997 from the Most Holy Trinity Parish in Balic-balic, Sampaloc, Manila, and it was during his term that the parish had electronic chromatically tuned carillon bells installed in its belfry. The Immaculate Conception Parish was declared one of the Jubilee churches in the Archdiocese of Manila in the year 2000.

In October 2001, the Ecclesiastical District of Pasig was created, covering the Vicariate of the Immaculate Conception, along with the parishes of Pateros and Taguig. Nestor Cariño served as the first district bishop.

Two years later, Pope John Paul II signed his Papal Bull, Deus Caritas, decreeing the establishment of a new diocese comprising Pasig, Pateros, and Taguig. The parish was designated to be the cathedral and seat of the Bishop of Pasig. Francisco San Diego became the founding bishop of the diocese on August 21, 2003. Gabriel became its first rector. After Gabriel resigned some weeks after, San Diego named the Vicar-General, Rodolfo Gallardo, as the new rector of the cathedral. Gallardo was installed rector. During his short stint as rector, he mobilized the church's PPCRV awareness campaign for the May 2004 national presidential elections and started the Simbamahalaan encounter between parish lay leaders and LGU leaders and workers of Pasig Hall. Upon his retirement in February 2005, San Diego took over as acting parish priest and rector.

In June 2005, Roy Rosales was named fourth rector of the cathedral. He spearheaded the restoration of most of the cathedral's artifacts, like the image of Our Lady of the Apocalypse, the Baptistery, the Cathedral Facade, the processional image of Our Lady of the Immaculate Conception, the retablos and the original image of the Our Lady of the Immaculate Conception, patroness of Pasig. It was also through the efforts of Rosales that the Immaculate Conception Cathedral-Parish witnessed the Solemn Canonical Coronation of its patron as Our Lady of the Immaculate Conception of Pasig last December 7, 2008. The celebration was led by the Apostolic Nuncio to the Philippines, Edward Joseph Adams, the Bishop of Pasig, and the entire faithful in the diocese.

In May 2010, Orlando Cantillon was named fifth rector of the cathedral. In February 2015, Bishop Mylo Vergara named Joselito I. Jopson, parish priest of Santo Rosario de Pasig Parish, as the sixth rector and eighth Filipino parish priest of the cathedral. In February 2021, Mariano L. Baranda was named the new rector and parish priest.

In February 2021, as part of the Celebration of the 500th Year Anniversary of the Arrival of Christianity in the Philippines, the Cathedral-Parish was named as a Jubilee Church in the Diocese of Pasig along with the Diocesan Shrine of St. Martha and Parish of St. Roch in Pateros and the Archdiocesan Shrine of St. Anne in Taguig.

On March 25, 2022, the 7 year-long restoration and renovation of the cathedral (including the addition of ceiling paintings) has finally come to a close with a grand inauguration and blessing officiated by Bishop Mylo Hubert Vergara. The restoration and renovation was done under the Abang Lingkod ni Maria under the supervision of Camarera Mayor Wilfrieda Legaspi. Along with this came the world premiere of 'Fresca Rosa Novella,' an aria for tenor, composed by the youngest member of the Abang Lingkod ni Maria, Gabriel L. Legaspi.

Ecclesiastical territory
Previously, the Immaculate Conception Cathedral belonged to the Archdiocese of Manila. It became the seat of the Diocese of Pasig in 2003

The Immaculate Conception Cathedral comprises nine communities divided according to the patron of the chapel in the community:

 Pamayanan ng Nuestra Senora Rosa Mystica
 Pamayanan ng San Jose
 Pamayanan ng San Felipe at Santiago
 Pamayanan ng Our Lady of Fatima
 Pamayanan ng Sta. Rosa de Lima 
 Pamayanan ng Sta. Rosa - Sumilang
 Pamayanan ng San Nicolas
 Pamayanan ng Sta. Cruz
 Pamayanan ng San Isidro Labrador at San Roque

Jurisdiction
The Immaculate Conception Cathedral comprises the following barangays in Pasig:

 Malinao 
 San Jose
 Bambang
 Bagong Katipunan
 Santa Rosa
 Sumilang
 San Nicolas
 Santa Cruz
 Kapasigan

Pastors 
Below is the list of Filipino parish priests.

See also
 Diocese of Pasig
 Francisco San Diego
 Archdiocese of Manila

References

Resources
 The 2010–2011 Catholic Directory of the Philippines (published by Claretian Publications for the Catholic Bishops' Conference of the Philippines, June 2008)
 Updated Diocese of Pasig Directory
 Aviso (Notice) by the Roman Catholic Bishop of Pasig dated February 22, 2021

External links
 
 

Roman Catholic churches in Metro Manila
Roman Catholic cathedrals in the Philippines
Cultural Properties of the Philippines in Metro Manila
Buildings and structures in Pasig